Takis are a Mexican brand of rolled corn tortilla chip snack made by Barcel, a subsidiary of Grupo Bimbo. Fashioned after the taquito, it comes in numerous flavors, the best selling of which is the chili-lime "Fuego" flavor, sold in distinctive purple bags.  Besides the rolled corn chips, Takis also produces a number of other snacks with the same flavor lines, including a number of different potato chip varieties, corn stix, popcorn, and peanuts.

Takis were invented in Mexico in 1999 and introduced to the United States in 2004. Barcel originally intended to aim Takis towards the Hispanic demographic of the snack market, but its popularity has quickly spread among teens of different cultural backgrounds.

Flavors
Takis are prepared in a variety of flavors, including:
 Angry Burger, a spicy hamburger and dill pickle flavor (green packaging)
Authentic Taco, a hot taco flavor (green packaging)
Bad zucchini, an incredibly spicy Zucchini flavor (similar to Fuego) (brown and green packaging)
BBQ Picante, a spicy barbecue flavor (brown packaging)
Blue Flame, an extreme barbecue flavor (blue packaging)
Blue Heat, a hot chili pepper flavor (blue packaging)
Cobra (red packaging)
Crunchy Fajitas, a chicken fajita flavor with a yellowish appearance (green packaging)
Fuego, a hot chili pepper and lime flavor. It is the spiciest of all varieties, as well as the most popular flavor (purple packaging).
Fuego azul, a spicy snack topped with a blue mystery spice powder, with a similar taste to Fuego. This flavor was released in the U.S. in 2019 as Blue Heat (blue packaging).
Guacamole, a spicy snack topped with a style of salsa guacamole (white packaging)
Lava, a cheese and chipotle flavor (orange packaging)
Nitro, a habanero chile flavor (black-red packaging)
Original, a slightly spicy snack (green packaging)
Outlaw, a spicy barbecue flavor (dark red packaging)
Party, a flavor of cheese and chile
Rock, a presentation with flavor of chorizo
Sal De Mar (formerly "Classic"), a mild snack topped with sea salt
Salsa Brava, a slightly spicier snack than the original (yellow packaging)
Scorpion BBQ, a barbecue flavor (brown and purple packaging)
Titan, a chipotle and lime flavor (dark red packaging)
Volcano Queso, a habanero cheese flavor (yellow-green and orange packaging)
Wild, a hot buffalo flavor (sky blue packaging)
 Xplosion, a spicy cheese-flavored and chili pepper variety (orange packaging)
Xtra Hot, a hot flavor similar to Fuego, but less spicy (black-purple packaging)
 Zombie, habanero and cucumber flavor (black-green packaging)

Other products
In July 2020, Razor released their scooter designed with the Takis brand. Also in that month, Totino's released Totino's Takis Fuego Mini Snack Bites, consisting of pizza snack rolls covered in Takis Fuego seasoning. In October 2020, Takis introduced Takis Hot Nuts, featuring peanuts in a crunchy shell coated with Takis seasoning. Its flavors include Fuego, Flare and Smokin' Lime. In 2021, Grupo Bimbo expanded the Takis snack portfolio to include:
 Takis Waves, ridged potato chip
 Takis Watz, cheese snack
 Takis POP!, ready-to-eat popcorn
 Takis Stix, corn snack stick
 Takis Crisps, potato chip shaped like Pringles
 Takis Kettlez, kettle-cooked potato chip snack
 Takis Hot Nuts, peanuts coated in crunchy corn snack
 Takis Chippz, thin-cut potato chips

Health concerns
There have been multiple claims on the Internet that Takis and other spicy snacks cause ulcers and cancer. Though the aforementioned claims have been confirmed as false, scientists and doctors have attributed gastritis and other stomach-related problems to Takis. It has been recommended that Takis should only be consumed in moderation.

References

Brand name snack foods
Mexican brands
Products introduced in 1999